The molecular formula C10H15NO2 (molar mass : 181.23 g/mol, exact mass : 181.110279) may refer to :

 2C-H
 N,N-Dimethyldopamine
 3,4-Dimethoxyphenethylamine
 Etilefrine, a cardiac stimulant
 Hexapropymate, a hypnotic/sedative
 Methylecgonidine
 Oxilofrin